IIAS could refer to
 International Institute for Asian Studies
 International Institute of Administrative Sciences
 Indian Institute of Advanced Study
 Indonesia International Auto Show
 Inventory information approval system
 International Institute for Advanced Studies in Systems Research and Cybernetics
 Institutional Investor Advisory Services
 Israel Institute for Advanced Studies